Old Jack is the first album from Brazilian blues/rock band O Bando do Velho Jack, and was recorded in 1998. This album was not officially released.

Track listing
 "Rock and Roll, Hoochie Koo"
 "Listen to the Music"
 "Lucille"
 "Cão de guarda"
 "While My Guitar Gently Weeps"
 "Not Fade Away"
 "Hoochie Koochie Man"
 "Born on the Bayou"
 "Layla"
 "Ohio"
 "Whiskey Man"
 "Walk Away"

References

O Bando do Velho Jack albums
1998 debut albums